Xylophanes rufescens is a moth of the  family Sphingidae. It is known from French Guiana, Venezuela, north-western Brazil and eastern Peru.

It is a large-eyed, rusty-brown species. The ground colour is buff, densely shaded and with scattered rust-brown marks. The forewing and hindwing underside are rust-brown.

Adults are probably on wing year-round.

The larvae probably feed on Rubiaceae and Malvaceae species.

References

rufescens
Moths described in 1895